Decamethylferrocene or bis(pentamethylcyclopentadienyl)iron(II) is a chemical compound with formula  or . It is a sandwich compound, whose molecule has an iron(II) cation  attached by coordination bonds between two pentamethylcyclopentadienyl anions. It can also be viewed as a derivative of ferrocene, with a methyl group replacing each hydrogen atom of its cyclopentadienyl rings.

This compound is a yellow crystalline solid that is used in chemical laboratories as a weak reductant. The iron(II) core is easily oxidized to iron(III), yielding the monovalent cation decamethylferrocenium, and even to higher oxidation states.

Preparation 
Decamethylferrocene is prepared in the same manner as ferrocene from pentamethylcyclopentadiene. This method can be used to produce other decamethylcyclopentadienyl sandwich compounds.
2 Li(C5Me5) + FeCl2 → Fe(C5Me5)2 + 2 LiCl

The product can be purified by sublimation.  has staggered  rings. The average distance between iron and each carbon is approximately 2.050 Å. This structure has been confirmed by X-ray crystallography.

Redox reactions 
Like ferrocene, decamethylferrocene forms a stable cation because Fe(II) is easily oxidized to Fe(III). Because of the electron donating methyl groups on the  groups, decamethylferrocene is more reducing than is ferrocene. In a solution of acetonitrile the reduction potential for the  couple is −0.59 V compared to a  reference (−0.48 V vs Fc/ in ). Oxygen is reduced to hydrogen peroxide by decamethylferrocene in acidic solution.

In the  salt, the  rings are parallel. In contrast, a tilt angle of 17° between the  rings is observed in the crystal structure of the  salt.

References 

Ferrocenes
Pentamethylcyclopentadienyl complexes
One-electron reducing agents